"All Eyes on You" is a song by American rapper Meek Mill, released as the first single from his second studio album Dreams Worth More Than Money, on June 26, 2015. The song features Nicki Minaj with additional vocals from Chris Brown. It is a hip hop and R&B song, produced by Danny Morris, Alex Delicata,  and co-produced by The Monarch, Kevin Cossom and DJ Khaled.

Commercial performance
"All Eyes on You" entered the Billboard Hot 100 at number 81 for the chart dated July 11, 2015. Its chart debut was aided in part by first-week download sales of 44,000. The following week, following the release of Dreams Worth More Than Money, it jumped to number 32, having sold an additional 62,000 copies It has so far peaked at number 21, becoming Meek Mill's highest-charting single to date until his single Going Bad from his new album Championships  peaked at number 6  . As of August 2015,  "All Eyes on You" has sold 214,000 copies domestically. On July 20, 2017, the single was cerified Double Platinum by the Recording Industry Association of America (RIAA) for combined sales and streaming equivalent units of over two million units in the United States.

Music video
Filming for the "All Eyes on You" video took place in late June 2015. The video was released on July 27, 2015. It was directed by Benny Boom. It also features a cameo appearance by American hip-hop trio Migos

Charts

Weekly charts

Year-end charts

Certifications

References 

2015 singles
Meek Mill songs
Chris Brown songs
Nicki Minaj songs
Songs written by Chris Brown
Songs written by Nicki Minaj
Maybach Music Group singles
2015 songs
Songs written by Kevin Cossom
Songs written by the Notorious B.I.G.
Songs written by Stevie J
Songs written by Meek Mill
Songs written by Danny Morris (music producer)
Songs written by Andre Davidson
Songs written by Sean Davidson
Song recordings produced by the Monarch (production team)
Atlantic Records singles